is a railway station in Kirishima, Kagoshima, Japan.

Lines

Layout 
The station, which is unstaffed, consists of two side platforms serving two tracks at grade. The station building, a simple shed of modern construction, is located on a hillside at a higher level than the platforms. From there, a flight of steps leads down to one platform and a footbridge leads to the other.

Platforms

JR

Adjacent stations

History
Subsequently, the two lines were linked and Kita-Naganoda was built as an intermediate station along the new linking track, opening on 6 December 1932. The entire stretch of track was designated as the Nippō Main Line. With the privatization of Japanese National Railways (JNR), the successor of JGR, on 1 April 1987, the station came under the control of JR Kyushu.

See also
List of railway stations in Japan

References

External links 

Kita-Naganoda (JR Kyushu)

Railway stations in Japan opened in 1932
Railway stations in Kagoshima Prefecture